Eskilstuna Municipality is a municipality in Södermanland County in southeast Sweden, between Lake Mälaren and Lake Hjälmaren. The seat of the municipality is in the city of Eskilstuna.

The present municipality was formed in 1971 by the merger of the City of Eskilstuna, the City of Torshälla and five rural municipalities. It is the largest municipality in the Sörmland region in terms of population, having more than 1/3 of the overall county population.

Geography

Localities

Alberga
Ärla
Borsökna
Bälgviken
Eskilstuna (seat)
Hållsta
Hällberga
Hällbybrunn
Kjulaås
Kvicksund (partly in Västerås Municipality)
Mesta
Skiftinge
Skogstorp
Torshälla
Tumbo

Elections

Riksdag
These are the results of the Riksdag elections of Eskilstuna Municipality since the 1972 municipality reform. The results of the Sweden Democrats were not published by SCB between 1988 and 1998 at a municipal level to the party's small nationwide size at the time. "Votes" denotes valid votes, whereas "Turnout" denotes also blank and invalid votes.

Blocs

This lists the relative strength of the socialist and centre-right blocs since 1973, but parties not elected to the Riksdag are inserted as "other", including the Sweden Democrats results from 1988 to 2006, but also the Christian Democrats pre-1991 and the Greens in 1982, 1985, and 1991. The sources are identical to the table above. The coalition or government mandate marked in bold formed the government after the election. New Democracy got elected in 1991 but is still listed as "other" due to the short lifespan of the party. "Elected" is the total number of percentage points from the municipality that went to parties who were elected to the Riksdag.

Twin towns - Sister cities

Eskilstuna is twinned with:

 Bridgeton, New Jersey, United States
 Erlangen, Germany
 Esbjerg, Denmark
 Fjarðabyggð, Iceland
 Gatchina, Russia
 Haapsalu, Estonia
 Jūrmala, Latvia
 Jyväskylä, Finland
 Linyi, China
 Luton, United Kingdom
 Lviv, Ukraine
 Stavanger, Norway
 Usangi, Tanzania

References

External links

Eskilstuna Municipality - Official site

 
Municipalities of Södermanland County